Figures on crime in London are based primarily on two sets of statistics: the Crime Survey for England and Wales (CSEW) and police recorded crime data. Greater London is generally served by three police forces; the Metropolitan Police which is responsible for policing the vast majority of the capital, the City of London Police which is responsible for The Square Mile of the City of London, and the British Transport Police which polices the national rail network and the London Underground. A fourth police force in London, the Ministry of Defence Police, do not generally become involved with policing the general public. London also has a number of small constabularies for policing parks. Within the Home Office crime statistic publications Greater London is referred to as the London Region.

Current trends
The Mayor’s Office for Policing & Crime (MOPAC) prepares quarterly performance reports for policing and crime in the Greater London area. Q1 2021 showed a reduction in all crime in London with the exception of hate crimes and domestic violence. Total notifiable offences (TNO) had decreased by 17.2% when compared to the same quarter in 2019/20 (-20,465) and had decreased by 8.1% (17,148) compared to Q2 2020. These figures include COVID-19 lockdown periods.

The Office for National Statistics data between June 2016 and March 2020 showed per person crime had increased by 31% in England and by a lower margin of 18% in London since 2016. These statistics only count crime recorded by police, and it's estimated by that overall crime continues to decrease.

The increase in crime recorded in London is not uniform across different types of offence. For example, while homicides increased over the period by 23% in London compared to 8% across England, violence against the person in general increased by 2% in London compared to 7% across England. Over the same period, sexual offences recorded by police in London fell by 2% while in England they remained flat. But robbery increased by 16% in London compared to 6% across England. Otherwise the increase in London over 2019/20 was largely driven by an increase in theft offences, including burglary. Theft is stealing from a person without the use or threat of force, robbery is stealing by using force or the threat of force on someone, and burglary is entering a property illegally in order to steal. Theft offences account for 50% of the Metropolitan Police's recorded crimes and increased by 4% last year. Across England they fell 5%.

Over the longer period the trend is similar. Since 2016, the number of police recorded theft offences (without force or threat) per person has increased by 23% in London, compared to a rise of 7% in England more widely, accounting for much of the recorded increase in crime in the capital.

His Majesty’s Inspectorate of Constabulary and Fire & Rescue Services (HMICFRS) independently assess the effectiveness and efficiency of police forces. In 2018 they reported the Met recorded just 89.5% of reported crime. Increases in recorded crime since are likely to be partly credited to improvements in the recording of reported crime across London, rather than simply an increase in crime experienced by residents and visitors.

A report that London crime had risen five times faster than the rest of the country since Sadiq Khan became Mayor in 2016 was debunked by the independent fact checker Full Fact. The misinformation is credited to Dan Wooton in the Sun on 1 October 2020, who may have misinterpreted an article in the Evening Standard on 17 July 2020 claiming the "over-arching figure for the total number of offences recorded by Metropolitan Police in the last financial year rose by five per cent in 2018".

Violent crime
Offences categorised as "violent crime" by the Home Office are violence against the person, including robbery and sexual offences. Sometimes includes kidnapping.  It was announced in September 2018 that the city planned to emulate Scotland's public health approach, inspired by Cure Violence in Chicago, to violent crime.  This saw the murder rate in Glasgow drop by more than a half between 2004 and 2017.  In 2018 Sadiq Khan announced funding of £500,000 for a Violence Reduction Unit, though this has been criticised as insufficient.

Homicide
Between 1990 and 2003 the number of homicides, i.e. murder, manslaughter, etc. in London averaged 120 per year, with a low of 109 in 1996, and a high of 222 in 2003. The number then fell in each and every year between 2004 and 2014 to a new low of 83. They then rose sharply to 118 in 2015 and 110 in 2016. In 2017 there was a further rise to 131, although this included the combined 14 victims of the Westminster Bridge (5), London Bridge (8), and Finsbury Park (1) terrorist attacks, but even with these major events was still lower than any year between 1990 and 2009.
As of 31 December 2018, there have been 132 homicides reported in London in 2018.
The year 2019 was reportedly London's bloodiest year since more than a decade, which recorded a 11-year high of 143 people being killed. As of 31 December 2019, the number of homicides reported reached 149, the highest in a decade. 2021 broke the record set in 2008 for teen homicide. This was reportedly the highest rate since World War II.

Of the 126 cases looked into by the Met:

 31 of them were categorised as domestic violence offences, included 12 resulting from stabbing
 44 of the homicides took place in a dwelling and 71 of them on the street
 Of the 126 victims, 14 were teenagers and 40 were aged between 20 and 24
 31 of the homicides were assessed as “gang-related”
 In 14 cases the killer used a firearm, and in 71, a knife

The distribution of homicide offences in London can vary significantly by borough.

Between 2001 and 2015 there were 2,326 offences committed in London.

Moped crime 

A noted trend since 2014 is robberies and assaults committed by individuals riding mopeds; Crime involving mopeds rose by more than 600% in London between 2014 and 2016.

Assault with injury

Assault with injury, currently comprising assault occasioning actual bodily harm and grievous bodily harm by the Metropolitan Police, accounts for on average 40% of all violence against the person offences within the Metropolitan Police area and 45% of all violence against the person nationally. In England and Wales, 'assault without injury' and harassment account for a further 38% of crimes recorded within the violence against the person category.

In 2008–09, there 70,962 assault with injury offences in London with a rate of 9.5 per 1,000 residents. This was slightly higher than the total rate for England and Wales, which was 7.0 per 1,000 residents.

Following the changes introduced by the National Crime Recording Standard (NCRS) in 2002, the way assaults were categorised was dependent on injury, leading to a significant jump in combined ABH and GBH figures nationally in 2002–03. Prior to NCRS, minor injuries were counted as common assault, while after NCRS any assault with injury would be categorised as ABH. Looking at figures over time is of limited value as figures prior to 2002–03 are not comparable with the way certain violent crimes have been recorded since then. These changes were not reflected in the Metropolitan Police performance figures until 2004/05, when the rate almost doubled to 9.4 per 1,000 residents compared to 5.8 the previous year. In 2005–06, the rate of recorded ABH and GBH peaked both nationally and within the Metropolitan Police force area according to recorded statistics.

The British Crime Survey or BCS is a systematic victim study, currently carried out by BMRB Limited on behalf of the Home Office. The BCS seeks to measure the amount of crime in England and Wales by asking around 50,000 people aged 16 and over, living in private households, about the crimes they have experienced in the last year. The survey is comparable to the National Crime Victimization Survey conducted in the United States. The Home Office estimated that just 37% of violence with injury offences were reported to and recorded by police.

An advantage of the BCS is that it has not been affected by the changes in counting rules and the way crime is categorised because it is survey-based. This makes it possible to observe national trends in crime over time. Crime in England and Wales 2008/09, shows BCS violence with injury to have peaked in 1995 and declined steadily since then. Between 1995 and 2008–09, the BCS estimates that violence with injury offences decreased 53.6% across England & Wales.

Gun and knife crime

Weapon-enabled crimes are recorded by the Metropolitan Police when a weapon is used to assist a crime, for example a gun being used as part of a robbery. Recorded gun- and knife-enabled offences in London account for about 2% of total recorded crime. The two London Boroughs with the highest rate of gun and knife crime are Southwark and Lambeth. Other London Boroughs with high gun and knife crime rates include Brent, Haringey and Hackney. Gun-enabled crime figures are displayed on the Metropolitan Police website at borough level expressed as financial year to date comparisons but they are seldom made available for historical comparisons. Figures are available for calendar years 2000 to 2007 as shown in the table below.

Since 2000 there has been consistent fluctuations in the number of gun-enabled crimes recorded by the Metropolitan Police which peaked in 2003 when there were 4,444 recorded offences. The lowest number of offences recorded was potentially in 2008 where there were just 1,980 gun-enabled crimes between December 2007 and November 2008, an unusually low figure in comparison to other years. Since then however gun-enabled crime has increased 67% across London with 3,309 offences being recorded in the 12 months to November 2009.

Knife-enabled crime figures are available from 2003 to 2007 and more recently monthly knife crime summaries are provided on the Metropolitan Police website showing financial year to date figures. Knife enabled offences increased from 2003 to 2004 and from then on saw annual reductions until 2007. It was not possible to retrieve statistics for 2008 and 2009.

The Metropolitan Police a number of operations that concentrate on knife and gun crime. They include Operation Trident and Trafalgar which deal with fatal and non-fatal shootings across London, Operation Blunt which was initially launched across 12 boroughs in 2004 to tackle knife crime and subsequently rolled out across the forces 32 boroughs in 2005 after early successes. Operation Blunt was re-launched as Operation Blunt II in 2008 with the aim of tackling serious youth violence. In addition to this there is the Specialist Firearms Command formerly known as SO19.

There has been an overall increase of crime rate especially knife stabbings from April 2010 (1093) to November 2018 (1208). Mayor of London, Sadiq Khan said that the knife crime offenders will be tagged with tracking GPS devices for a year upon their release from the prison which will record their movements against the location of reported crimes & revert to police with the information.

Key Insights

 Knife-related crime had a yearly increase of 10% in England and Wales in 2021.
 Teenage deaths due to knife crimes were the highest in 18 years.
 Men perform most of the London stabbing offences.
 Class, social standing, and socio-economic background are the only correlated causes of violent crimes.

Robbery

Recording of robbery offences in England and Wales are sub-divided into Business Robbery (robbery of a business, e.g. a bank robbery) and Personal Robbery (taking an individuals personal belongings with force/threat). Annually business robbery offences in London account for on average 10% of total robbery offences.

Robbery offending across London fell almost 20% between 1996 and 1998 from 32,867 to 26,330 offences. Following changes in counting rules of crimes and the later introduction of the National Crime Recording Standard offences of robbery rose both nationally and within London. In London offences increased by 25% in 1999 compared with 1998. There was a 25% increase between 1999 and 2000/01 and a further 30% increase between 2000/01 and 2001/02 when the robbery rate in London peaked to 7.1 offences per 1,000 population. In March 2002 the government launched the 'Street Crime Initiative' with the aim of reducing robbery in the most affected police forces, including the Metropolitan Police. Nationally the 'Street Crime Initiative' achieved a reduction in robbery of 32% by March 2005. In London during the same period robbery reduced by 27% from 53,547 in 2001/02 to 39,033 in 2004/05. After the initiative had finished robbery offences increased and stayed at a rate of around 6.0 per 1,000 for the next two financial years, however, there has now been a steady annual decline in robbery rates across London since 2006/07.

The increases in robbery were largely attributed to the rise in youth on youth robberies across London with particular focus around schools and transport interchanges and increased usage and ownership of items such as mobile phones, one of the most commonly stolen items. The increases that followed the end of the street crime initiative were thought somewhat to be a result of the increased mobility of young people when the introduction of oyster cards to provide under-16s free travel on London's transport network was introduced.

Race and crime

City of London Police 
A stop and search overview from July 2017 to June 2018 found that black people were two times more likely to be stopped than white people. When stopped, whites were more unwilling to state their ethnicity than other racial groups. The most common reason for a search was suspected drugs possession. Asians were most commonly stopped in relation to drugs (66%), and then blacks (62%). Whites were subjected to a notable lower level of drug searches (50%). However, despite this, whites had the lowest rate of NFA (no further action). For Asians, 60% of individuals were no further actioned and 28% were arrested. For blacks, roughly 61% of individuals were no further actioned and 20% were arrested. For whites, only 53% were no further actioned while the arrest rate was 27%. Overall, blacks had the lowest arrest rate and the highest no further action rate - despite being subjected to twice as many searches as whites. When stopped, whites were the most likely to be found in breach of drug laws, having the lowest corresponding no further action rate.

Metropolitan Police 
In the year to March 2020, there were 563,837 stop and searches in England and Wales (these figures include the British Transport Police). Almost half of these searches were carried out by the Metropolitan Police. As of the 2011 Census, 40.2% of Londoners identified as BAME. London has the highest stop and search rates for most ethnic minority groups. Amid growing concerns police are disproportionately targeting black Londoners, the then Metropolitan Police Commissioner, Cressida Dick, acknowledged the force “is not free of discrimination, racism or bias". Deputy Assistant Commissioner, Bas Javid, admitted the Metropolitan Police has a problem with racism.

Street crimes include muggings, assault with intent to rob, and snatching property. Black males accounted for 29 percent of the male victims of gun crime and 24 percent of the male victims of knife crime. Similar statistics were recorded for females. On knife crime, 45 percent of suspected female perpetrators were black; for gun crime, 58 percent; and for robberies, 52 percent. A study by the Home Office published in 2003 found that 70 per cent of mugging victims on commuter railways around London identified their muggers as black. The study also reported that 87 per cent of victims in Lambeth, South London, told the police that their attackers were black.Operation Trident was set up in March 1998 by the Metropolitan Police to investigate gun crime in London's black community after black-on-black shootings in Lambeth and Brent.

Regarding drugs, white people are the most likely to be found in possession when stopped and searched. Whites were also more likely to be found in possession of weapons when searched. Overall, criminal offences were more likely to be detected among whites and Asians after stop and search.

Regarding Human trafficking and modern slavery, Eastern Europeans and Chinese gangs are the main perpetrators.

Between April 2005 and January 2006, figures from the Metropolitan Police Service showed that black people accounted for 46 percent of car-crime arrests generated by automatic number plate recognition cameras.

In June 2010 The Sunday Telegraph, through a Freedom of Information Act request, obtained statistics on accusations (as opposed to actual convictions) of crime broken down by race from the Metropolitan Police Service. The figures showed that the majority of males who were accused of violent crimes in 2009–10 were black. Of the recorded 18,091 such accusations against males, 54 percent accused of street crimes were black; for robbery, 59 percent; and for gun crimes, 67 percent. However, black people tend to have a slightly lower conviction ratio (the percentage of defendants convicted out of all those prosecuted) so arrests from accusations and suspicions often fail to result in corresponding convictions. In the same The Sunday Telegraph report, Simon Woolley commented: “Although the charge rates for some criminal acts amongst black men are high, black people are more than twice as likely to have their cases dismissed, suggesting unfairness in the system".

In 2017, The Independent reported on statistics from HM Inspectorate of Constabulary (HMICFRS), for the year 2016-17. The Metropolitan Police and City of London Police were among the 43 police forces considered. The report found that white people more likely to be carrying drugs when stopped and searched - despite being searched up to 8 times less than black people. 
 
In 2018 Sky News initiated freedom of information request to every police force in the country. The statistics showed that black people were over-represented as victims of homicide and in homicide convictions in London, with 48% of murder suspects being black compared to 13% of the population. However, black people tend to have slightly lower conviction rates so arrests from accusations often fail to result in a corresponding conviction. Gov.uk reported that in 2017 the conviction rate for black suspects was 78.7 compared to the Asian average of 80.3 in the same year and the white conviction rate of 85.3 

In 2019, The Guardian reported on statistics obtained from the Mayor’s Office for Policing and Crime (MOPAC), for the year 2018. The figures revealed that despite whites being subjected to significantly lower levels of stop and search than blacks, crime was more likely to be detected amongst white Londoners, when they were stop and searched. Whites were more likely to be in possession of weapons and drugs, more likely to be arrested after a search and more likely to be found guilty than black Londoners - despite black Londoners being targeted by police more often. The Guardian quoted figures showing for white Londoners, 30.5% of searches resulted in further action, for Asians 27.8%, and for black Londoners 26.7%. Dr Krisztián Pósch, from the London School of Economics commented "The data shows that police are not just stopping black people more disproportionately, but are less likely to detect crime when they do compared to when they stop white people”.

According to the National Crime Agency (NCA), human trafficking in the UK is a rapidly growing issue with criminal, labour and sexual as the most common forms of exploitation. The Joint Committee On Human Rights state human traffickers tend to be "split between people from the Far East, the Chinese gangs, and Eastern European gangs". As of 2004, vice squad officers estimated Albanian operations in London's Soho were worth more than £15 million a year. In 2020, a report by ITV News stated 70% of London's brothels are controlled by Albanians. According to a 2020 Home Office report, the UK cocaine market is now largely dominated by Albanian Organised Crime Groups. Tony Saggers (former head of drugs threat and intelligence at the National Crime Agency), stated the sale of cocaine in most major UK cities, including London, is now largely controlled by Albanian crime groups. London is the primary "hub" for Albanian organised crime. Albanians have overtaken Poles as the largest group of foreign prisoners in UK jails.

Bicycle thefts
In 2014, the number of bicycles reported stolen to the Metropolitan Police and City of London Police forces came to 17,809. However the true number of bicycle thefts may be much larger as many victims do not report it to the police. According to the British Crime Survey and Transport for London only one in four victims of bicycle thefts actually report the crime.

Metropolitan force comparisons
Below are crime rate comparisons for London and the metropolitan districts of England in 2007/08 financial year.

Notable crime 
Jack the Ripper terrorised London in the 19th century.
 In the 80s and 90s, the IRA set off a number of bombs in London.
 The murder of Stephen Lawrence in 1993.
In July 2005, terrorists set off 4 bombs on 3 London Underground trains and a double-decker bus, killing 52 and injuring over 700, in the country's first Islamist suicide attack.
Wayne Couzens, a Metropolitan Police constable, kidnapped Sarah Everard, a 33 year old woman and later murdered her in 2021.
Murder of Fusilier Lee Rigby. 22 May 2013, a British Army soldier, Fusilier Lee Rigby of the Royal Regiment of Fusiliers, was attacked and killed by Michael Adebolajo and Michael Adebowale near the Royal Artillery Barracks in Woolwich, southeast London.

See also 
 Crime in the United Kingdom
 Gangs in the United Kingdom

Footnotes

References

External links
 Additional information
Government Office for London Data & Analytical Tools
 Give Life Domestic Violence Project
Home Office Statistical Publications Archive
 Knife City – Carrying a knife. Its not a game
 Metropolitan Police Crime Mapping Site 
 Metropolitan Police Publication Scheme 
 National Policing Improvement Agency Local Crime Mapping
London City Hall - Making London Safer for Young People
UK / London Crime Statistics and Crime Statistic Comparisons
London Knife Crime Statistics

 Maps
Crystal Roof - Crime rates per postcode in London
Metropolitan Police - Crime data dashboard 
Neighbourhood Perception and Crime Comparator

 
Police forces of London